Stephen Earl Wilhite (March 3, 1948 – March 14, 2022) was an American computer scientist who worked at CompuServe and was the engineering lead on the team that created the GIF image file format in 1987. GIF went on to become the de facto standard for 8-bit color images on the Internet until PNG (1996) became a widely supported alternative. The format later became the subject of a patent assertion by Unisys on its use of the LZW compression algorithm. Known as the inventor or creator of the GIF, Wilhite received a Webby Lifetime Achievement Award in 2013.

Biography
Stephen Earl Wilhite was born in West Chester Township, Ohio, on March 3, 1948, the son of Anna Lou (Dorsey), a nurse, and Clarence Earl Wilhite, a factory worker. Wilhite's team at CompuServe developed the GIF (Graphic Interchange Format) in 1987. Its adoption by the earliest web browser in 1991 helped make it a few years later in 1995 the most popular image file format. Twenty years later in 2016, the format still had mainstream use in website design, social media posts, workflow documents and how-to guides.

Wilhite remained a CompuServe/AOL employee into the first decade of the 21st century, working on a variety of CompuServe systems. These included CompuServe's wire protocols, such as Host Micro Interface (HMI) and CompuServe B protocol for the CompuServe Information Manager (CIM); new service features in the early 1990s; Web chat software in the late 1990s; and investigating Web community models until his 2001 departure after suffering a stroke.

Wilhite's name comes up frequently in debate over the pronunciation of the GIF acronym. "The Oxford English Dictionary accepts both pronunciations," Wilhite said. "They are wrong. It is a soft 'G', pronounced 'jif'. End of story." The intended pronunciation deliberately echoes the American peanut butter brand Jif.

Wilhite died at a hospital in Cincinnati, Ohio, following complications from COVID-19 on March 14, 2022, aged 74.

References

1948 births
2022 deaths
Scientists from Ohio
CompuServe
American computer scientists
Computer graphics professionals
Webby Award winners
Deaths from the COVID-19 pandemic in Ohio
People from West Chester, Butler County, Ohio